is the seventeenth studio album by the Japanese metal band Loudness. It was released only in Japan, in 2002.

Track listing
All lyrics by Minoru Niihara, music as indicated.

"Hellrider" (Akira Takasaki & Loudness) - 5:30
"Biosphere" (Masayoshi Yamashita & Loudness) - 3:52
"Savior" (Yamashita & Loudness) - 3:44
"My Precious" (Takasaki & Loudness) - 5:08
"Wind from Tibet" (Yamashita & Loudness) - 5:39
"System Crush" (Yamashita & Loudness) - 4:23
"The Night Is Still Young" (Takasaki & Loudness) - 4:37
"Shame on You" (Yamashita & Loudness) - 5:53
"Break My Mind" (Munetaka Higuchi & Loudness) - 4:30
"So Beautiful" (Yamashita & Loudness) - 4:53
"For You" (Niihara & Loudness) - 6:53

Personnel
Loudness
Minoru Niihara - vocals
Akira Takasaki - guitars
Masayoshi Yamashita - bass 
Munetaka Higuchi - drums

Production
Masatoshi Sakimoto - engineer, mixing
Kazumi Tokue, Nobuko Shimura, Tadashi Hashimoto - assistant engineers
Yoichi Aikawa - mastering
Nobuo Naka, Yukichi Kawaguchi - supervisors
Noricazu Shimano - executive producer

References

2002 albums
Loudness (band) albums
Japanese-language albums
Tokuma Shoten albums